Christopher Minard (born November 18, 1981) is a Canadian former professional ice hockey player. He played in the National Hockey League (NHL) with the Pittsburgh Penguins and Edmonton Oilers before finishing his career in the Deutsche Eishockey Liga (DEL). Minard began his professional career in 2002 with the Pensacola Ice Pilots of the ECHL. His brother, Mike Minard, also played briefly in the NHL, as a goaltender for the Edmonton Oilers.

Playing career
During the 2004–05 season he played with the Alaska Aces, and made his AHL debut, playing one game with the Milwaukee Admirals. During the NHL lockout, Minard played on a line with Scott Gomez, who had returned to his hometown of Anchorage to play for the season. During the season, Minard posted career highs in goals scored. This led to Gomez influencing New Jersey Devils management to give Minard a training camp slot, where he would earn a spot for the 2005–06 AHL season with the Albany River Rats, and the 2006–07 season with the Lowell Devils.

Minard was signed by the Penguins on July 12, 2007. He made his NHL debut on January 21, 2008 against the Washington Capitals. On February 26, Minard recorded his first NHL point, with an assist against the New York Islanders. Minard scored his first NHL goal on March 12, 2008, beating Ryan Miller of the Buffalo Sabres.

On July 13, 2009 he signed a one-year deal with the Edmonton Oilers, one month after the Pittsburgh Penguins won the Stanley Cup.  Minard was included on team picture, and awarded a Stanley Cup Ring.  He did not play enough games to get his name stamped on the Stanley Cup.

After three seasons in the German DEL, with Kölner Haie and failing the qualify for the playoffs in the 2014–15 season, Minard opted to leave the club and sign a two-year contract with rivals Düsseldorfer EG on March 4, 2015. At the conclusion of his second year with Düsseldorfer in the 2016–17 season, having contributed with just 9 points in 49 games, Minard opted to end his professional career after 15 seasons.

Career statistics

References

External links

1981 births
Living people
Alaska Aces (ECHL) players
Albany River Rats players
Canadian ice hockey centres
Düsseldorfer EG players
Edmonton Oilers players
Grand Rapids Griffins players
Sportspeople from Owen Sound
Kölner Haie players
Lowell Devils players
Milwaukee Admirals players
Oshawa Generals players
Owen Sound Platers players
Pensacola Ice Pilots players
Pittsburgh Penguins players
San Angelo Saints players
Springfield Falcons players
Toronto St. Michael's Majors players
Undrafted National Hockey League players
Wilkes-Barre/Scranton Penguins players
Ice hockey people from Ontario
Canadian expatriate ice hockey players in Germany
Canadian expatriate ice hockey players in the United States